Asociația Tradiția Militară (English: Military Tradition Association) is a Romanian World War I reenactment affiliated with the Romanian Land Forces. It was founded by history enthusiasts in 2004. It has annually participated in the military parade of the Romanian Armed Forces organized on the occasion of Great Union Day under the Arcul de Triumf. It first took part in this event in 2009. In 2016, it took part the Chișinău Independence Day Parade on Great National Assembly Square. It has marched 9 foreign countries: France, Italy, Germany, Austria, the Czech Republic, Hungary, Bulgaria, Ukraine and Russia. It represents Romania at the European Union of Historical-Military Associations.

See also
Fort Henry Guard
List of historical reenactment groups

References

Reenactment of the late modern period
Historical reenactment groups
Military of Romania
Tourist attractions in Romania
2004 establishments in Romania